The Coors International Bicycle Classic (1980–1988) was a stage race sponsored by the Coors Brewing Company.  Coors was the race's second sponsor; the first, Celestial Seasonings, named the race after its premium tea Red Zinger, which began in 1975.  Over the years, the event became America's national tour, listed as the fourth largest race in the world after the Tour de France, Giro d'Italia, and Vuelta a España.  The race grew from 3 days of racing in its first years as the Red Zinger Bicycle Classic to 2 weeks in the later Coors Classic years.  Race stages were held in Colorado in the early years, expanding first from Boulder and Denver back to the Keystone ski resort, later adding Estes Park, Vail, Aspen, and Grand Junction, before further expansion that included Wyoming, Nevada, California, and Hawaii.  All but the last year the race concluded with a short circuit in North Boulder Park.  On August 4, 2010, Colorado governor Bill Ritter and cycling legend Lance Armstrong announced that they would revive stage racing in Colorado with the USA Pro Cycling Challenge. It was a seven-day race held in August 2011.

History 

In 1975, Mo Siegel and John and Wyck Hay, founders of the Celestial Seasonings herbal tea company, launched the Red Zinger Bicycle Classic race to promote their new Red Zinger tea.

In 1979, Michael Aisner, the race's then PR director, bought the race for one dollar from Siegel, and with his blessing took the idea of a grander event to Peter Coors, the beer impresario.

Over the next eight years, the Coors Classic grew into two weeks of racing in California, Nevada, and Colorado, with stages in some years in Hawaii and Wyoming. The race's legendary merchandise had custom annual graphics, sold in every state (and even Japan and England), generating $1 million in 1987 and $1.5 million in 1988 in sales to help support the race.

The Red Zinger and Coors Classic stage races showcased world-class men and women's cycling throughout the scenic terrain of Colorado, California, Nevada, Wyoming, and Hawaii. The race was considered the fourth biggest race on the world cycling calendar and was ground-breaking as the single biggest women's stage race ever held.

The Coors Classic launched the careers of some of the world's greatest cyclists and paved the way for the sport's growth in the U.S.

A permanent tribute to the Classics was created in 2018 in North Boulder Park, where the race ended 12 of its 13 years.  Plaques tell the stories of the race near a cobblestone Champions Plaza, where the 19 winner's names are inscribed.

Winners

Facts 

The Coors International Bicycle Classic had many storied stages, including the world-renowned Morgul-Bismarck circuit. The site of the Grand Junction, Colorado, road race, the Colorado National Monument, was so exotic in appearance that the stage became known as "The Tour of the Moon" and was even featured in the Warner Brothers movie American Flyers. One recurring stage near Snowmass, Colorado, was run up "Suicide Hill", a road so steep that it was heated in the winter. Races were run over mountains such as the Vail, Independence, and McClure Passes in Colorado. Popular recurring stages in California included San Francisco-area events such as a hill climb up to famed Coit Tower for a prologue and the Fisherman's Wharf Criterium and a road stage crossing the Sierra Nevada range. One year the race also started in Hawaii's Big Island in Hilo with a volcano circuit road race that had to be rerouted a month before the event when the perimeter road course was cut off by a lava flow from Kilauea. Another year a stage went from Wyoming's capitol, Cheyenne, to Colorado's capitol, Denver. The race finished every year but its last in North Boulder Park.

The Red Zinger/Coors Classic served as an inspiration for a youth bicycle road racing series in Colorado called the Red Zinger Mini Classics, which ran from 1981–1992, serving as a springboard for the development of several professional cyclists, including pro greats Bobby Julich, Jonathan Vaughters, Chris Wherry, Ruthie Matthes, Colby Pearce and Jimi Killen.

See also
Colorado Classic, Colorado cycling race held for both men and women in 2017 and 2018; becomes a women-only event from 2019 forward
USA Pro Cycling Challenge, Colorado cycling race held from 2011-2015

References

External links
"Inside Cycling: Aisner and the Coors Classic" from VeloNews 
  "Pro Cycling News" Interview with Michael Aisner
 Celestial Seasonings corporate timeline
 BernardHinault.com
  Red Zinger and Coors Classic posters and program publishing]
 A Classic Western Quarrel: A History of the Road Controversy at Colorado National Monument
Pezcyclingnews interview of Michael Aisner by Matt Wood

Cycle races in the United States
Defunct cycling races in the United States
Recurring sporting events disestablished in 1988
Recurring sporting events established in 1979
1979 establishments in Colorado
Road bicycle races
1988 disestablishments in the United States
Cycling in Colorado
Super Prestige Pernod races